Yareshlaman (also Romanized as Yareshlamān; also known as Yareshlamān-e Bālā) is a village in Pir Kuh Rural District, Deylaman District, Siahkal County, Gilan Province, Iran. At the 2006 census, its population was 169, in 44 families.

References 

Populated places in Siahkal County